Giorgi Popkhadze (born 25 September 1986) is a Georgian former footballer who played as a defender.

Club career
In the summer of 2012 Popkhadze signed for Azerbaijan Premier League side FK Baku. After making 24 appearances in all competitions, Popkhadze was released at the end of the 2012–13 season.

International career
Popkhadze made his debut for Georgia on 1 March 2006, in a 2–0 friendly win against Malta.

Career statistics

International

Honours
Zestafoni
Umaglesi Liga (1): 2010–11

References

External links

Career statistics at Danmarks Radio
  Profile at londonhearts.com

1986 births
Living people
Footballers from Georgia (country)
Expatriate footballers from Georgia (country)
Erovnuli Liga players
Danish Superliga players
Austrian Football Bundesliga players
Azerbaijan Premier League players
Ekstraklasa players
Viborg FF players
SK Sturm Graz players
FC Baku players
Jagiellonia Białystok players
FC Sioni Bolnisi players
Flamurtari Vlorë players
Georgia (country) international footballers
Georgia (country) under-21 international footballers
Expatriate men's footballers in Denmark
Expatriate footballers in Austria
Expatriate footballers in Azerbaijan
Expatriate footballers in Poland
Olympiacos F.C. players
Association football defenders
Expatriate sportspeople from Georgia (country) in Azerbaijan